José de Villamil or José Villamil (1789–1866) was born in New Orleans, when Louisiana was a colony of Spain. He was one of the fathers of the independence of Ecuador, founder of its navy, "conqueror" and first Governor of the Galápagos Islands and Minister of Foreign Relations. The city of General Villamil Playas is named in honor of him. José de Villamil was the younger brother of Felipe Martin de Villamil (1783–1843).

In 1803, Louisiana was sold to the United States by France. In 1804 seated place as Cadet of "Company of Rifles volunteers Louisiana"  and then he was promoted to Sergeant. In 1810 he traveled to Spain recommended by his older brothers Felipe Martin and Pedro Villamil, was received paternally by General Ignacio Alava, Governor of Cadiz, who invited numerous "soire". The Governor's wife wanted to learn some dance steps and especially one called "L'Oiseleur" and Villamil taught it to her influence to obtain the release of several French officers who posed as luisianeses is not. The gentle lady Alava nicknamed him "Choctaw" Villamil symbolic name that kept the rest of his life. Cadiz also frequented distinguished American and entered the Masonic Lodge "Lautaro" in the company of Mexican Lorenzo de Velasco. The Argentinian Manuel de Sarratea asked: Are you able to consecrate to the American cause? 'We hugged and made the oath, he wrote years later to the king.

He immediately traveled to Maracaibo (Venezuela) where his brothers lived in good social and economic position. He wrote revolutionary letters  intercepted by the Governor of Maracaibo and only thanks to influences escaped death by firing squad.

In 1811 he was in Guayaquil dedicated to trade and achieved huge profits. In 1813 he traveled to the United States and bought the schooner "Alcance" that brought loaded guns to sell to Viceroy Pezuela. It came with his widowed mother. That year he married Ana Garaycoa Llaguno.

South American Wars of Independence
In 1815, on a business trip to Port-au-Prince (Haiti) he met the Liberator Simon Bolivar, who invited him to collaborate with the revolutionary actions against the Crown of Spain.

On February 8, 1816, he was traveling with his wife and two daughters to Callao, when off Isla Verde they spotted a corsair squadron anchored in Puná. Villamil turned to warn of the danger, being chased by a brigantine and a schooner and as he passed the Punta de Piedra fort he asked them to fire and stop them. At one in the morning of the 9th he arrived at the port and sounded the alarm. Eight hours later the fleet appeared and Villamil received the order to position himself with a company in "a pampita" in front of the shore and from there he answered the fire with serious danger to his life. The battle favored the people of Guayaquil who boarded the enemy's flagship Santísima Trinidad and took prisoner captain Guillermo Brown, sent by the Revolutionary Junta of the United Provinces of the Río de la Plata to obtain the independence of Guayaquil and not to plunder it as was believed at first. Villamil acted as translator and found out about the project.

In 1818 he lived in Lima and worked for independence. But the Viceroy José de La Serna made him reprove his libertarian intentions through the mouth of Marshal José de la Mar, inspector general of the Viceroyalty.

On October 1, 1820, he organized a dance at his house to bring together the officers of the royalist battalions stationed in Guayaquil, with the aim of initiating a conspiracy. In the following days, he visited various personalities, offering them the direction of the movement. On Saturday the 7th, the conspirators including the Peruvian lieutenant colonel Gregorio Escobedo, second in command of the garrison, decided to advance the revolution to the early hours of Monday the 9th, because the authorities were beginning to suspect that something was afoot. On October 9 Guayaquil woke up free from Spanish rule and Villamil was acclaimed in the streets for being one of the main leaders of the revolution together with the Venezuelan officers Luis Urdaneta and León de Febres Cordero. His wife made the blue and white flag that she threw from the balcony of her house to the town, in the early hours of the morning.

On the 14th he was commissioned to report to Lord Cochrane, that he was with his fleet somewhere in the Pacific. Villamil found him on the 31st anchored in the bay of Ancón and the next day he was presented to Libertador San Martín who gave him a horse and promoted him to Lieutenant Colonel, decorating him with the Order El Sol del Perú in the degree of Knight. Upon his return Villamil brought 150 carbines; and received the medal of "Los Libertadores de Guayaquil" and the title of Lieutenant Colonel in November, after the installation of the Electoral College.

Later he commanded a battalion created to contain the royalists in Babahoyo and had as chief the Peruvian colonel Toribio Luzuriaga, sent by San Martín to support the independence of Guayaquil. On the 21st he assisted in the defense of Guayaquil when the gunboats and two warships revolted, he traveled to Panama and embarked the "Córdoba" division that will fight in the Pichincha. For these trips, the State recognized a credit, which will not be canceled and years later it was transferred to a third party, with 10% of its value, so that he could try to collect it.

In 1822 she was part of the group of "Colombians" led by her sisters-in-law, the Garaycoa, and became close friends with the Liberator Simón Bolívar, whom she continually visited to read various works in French. After the Battle of Pichincha he was promoted to Colonel.

After Independence War
In 1824 he asked the Cabildo for authorization to provide water to the city, but the project was a failure. In 1828 he defended Guayaquil from the Peruvian Blockade and when the square was handed over to deposit he was taken prisoner with his brothers-in-law José and Francisco de Garaycoa. Between 1829 and 30 he held the Presidency of the Municipality.

In October 1831, he sent an exploratory commission to the Galápagos archipelago in order to find out about the existence of orchilla, a plant used to dye fabrics and that was exported to Mexico- on November 14, he constituted the "Sociedad Colonizadora of the Galapagos Archipelago" and denounced Charles Island, later called Floreana, as vacant land. In December he joined the revolution of General Luis Urdaneta and was elected Commander of Arms of Guayaquil.

In January 1832, he formed a "Milicia Corps" to repel the attack of the soldiers of the Flores battalion that had risen up. On the 20th, an expedition to the Galápagos under the command of Colonel Ignacio Hernández left. In 1833 he held the Consulate General of the United States in Guayaquil for a few months and traveled to the Galapagos as Governor of the Archipelago; there he exercised the position "with tact, sagacity and great practical spirit."
 
The ship HMS Beagle brought to Galapagos the British scientific expedition under the command of Captain Robert FitzRoy on September 15, 1835. Together with the young naturalist Charles Darwin, they undertook a study of the geology and biology of four of the islands before continuing their expedition around the world. The ship remained sailing for five weeks within the archipelago, but Darwin was on land for only two weeks. He investigated the animals and plants of the region that allowed Darwin to formulate the theory of the origin of the species. Villamil resigned from the governorship of the Galápagos in 1837 because the number of settlers had decreased. In his place he left General Pedro Mena, who will take care of his property. In 1841 he was called up for military service and took part in the Pasto campaign with General Juan José Flores. He returned to the Galapagos and with money loaned to his daughter Ana de Alarcón he moved the cattle on his property to avoid friction with the settlers of "Floreana".

In early August 1842, he was in the Galápagos when he learned of the yellow fever epidemic in Panama. Then it was done at full sail in order to communicate the news so that all the ships from the north, coming from the coasts of Mexico, Central America and Panama, would be declared in quarantine, but when it arrived at the port it was too late, because days before, on August 31, the English schooner "Reina Victoria" had anchored, coming from Veraguas, with several patients; and shortly after the "Witch" also infected arrived.

After the Revolution of March 6, 1845, he was sent to Manabí to get the Governor José María Urbina to support the movement. He returned to Guayaquil with a "Division of revolutionaries"

His first report on the Galapagos read: 

He attended the combats of "La Elvira" losing one of his ships in a shipwreck while transporting the troops and having claimed his amount from the National Congress, he only obtained that he be promoted to General of the Republic and the performance of the Customs administration of Manabí , where he had a romantic affair with Casimira Chávez, which gave him another daughter. (two)

See also
Ana Villamil Icaza

References 

El general José de Villamil y la Independencia de Hispanoamerica, de Benjamin Rosales Valenzuela, Guayaquil, 11/2004.

External links
 Diccionario Biográfico Ecuador : https://web.archive.org/web/20070928151738/http://www.diccionariobiograficoecuador.com/tomos/tomo7/v4.htm y 
 Génesis de la Armada de Ecuador : http://militar.org/armada.ecuador.htm y 
 Lista de los ministros de relaciones exteriores del Ecuador : https://web.archive.org/web/20060906023003/http://www.mmrree.gov.ec/mre/documentos/ministerio/cancilleres/jose%20villamil.htm y 

1789 births
1866 deaths
People from New Orleans
Ecuadorian military personnel
Foreign ministers of Ecuador
Governors of Galápagos Province